Lidija Ivanovna Savic-Ljubickaja (October 24, 1886 - September 18, 1982) was a Soviet botanist, bryologist, and professor.

Biography
In 1912, Savic-Ljubickaja became an employee of the Komarov Botanical Institute under the direction of Vladimir Andreevich Tranzschel and with the assistance of Vladimir Leontyevich Komarov. She began to publish papers on bryophytes and lichens in 1914, and began to travel extensively throughout Karelia, the Kola Peninsula, the North Caucasus, Crimea, and Central Russia.  During the outbreak of World War I, she began studying the prospects of using sphagnum moss for dressing wounds. As a result, it saw widespread use in hospitals. She retired in 1963.

She published her last paper allegedly when she was 90. Her book was published in 1970, when she was 84.

References 

1886 births
1982 deaths
Soviet botanists
Bryologists
Women bryologists
Women botanists